Lead hydroxide may refer to:

 Lead(II) hydroxide
 Lead(IV) hydroxide